Tõlluste is a village in Saaremaa Parish, Saare County in western Estonia.

Before the administrative reform in 2017, the village was in Pihtla Parish.

See also

 Toell the Great

References 

Villages in Saare County